NASCAR Mexico is a joint-venture between NASCAR and OCESA, a Mexican entertainment company, aiming to develop, manage and operate local motorsports events and oversee television distribution, sponsorship and licensing.

The venture attempts to create marketing programs to increase interest in local NASCAR events as well as NASCAR events in the United States that are televised in Mexico.

NASCAR Mexico had been responsible for the organization of the Corona México 200, a former NASCAR Nationwide Series race at the Autódromo Hermanos Rodríguez in Mexico City.

It also organizes and sanctions two racing series, the NASCAR PEAK Mexico Series and the NASCAR Mexico T4 Series.

The series experienced its first fatality on June 14, 2009, when Carlos Pardo was killed in an accident on the final lap. Pardo was declared the winner of the same race he was killed in after he led the final completed lap.

Champions

References

NASCAR extends to Mexico

External links

Auto racing organizations
NASCAR
Motorsport in Mexico
Joint ventures